Marvel Amos Smith (born August 6, 1978) is a former American football offensive tackle who played nine seasons in the National Football League (NFL). He played college football for Arizona State University. He was drafted by the Pittsburgh Steelers in the second round of the 2000 NFL Draft, and also was a member of the San Francisco 49ers. A one-time Pro Bowl selection, Smith earned two Super Bowl rings with the Steelers.

Early years
Smith attended Skyline High School in Oakland, California, and was a top student and a letterman in football. In football, he was a two-time All-City selection.

College career
Smith attended Arizona State University, where he was an All-American first-team selection in 1999, having only allowed one sack all season. He earned a bachelor's degree in interdisciplinary studies.

Professional career

Pittsburgh Steelers
Smith was selected by the Pittsburgh Steelers in the second round (38th overall) in the 2000 NFL Draft. He was selected to represent the AFC in the 2005 Pro Bowl for the first time after winning Super Bowl XL. Smith was considered by many to be one of the most important players on the Steelers' offensive line. Unfortunately, back injuries hampered him at the end of 2007 and limited him to a handful of games in 2008. The Steelers chose not to re-sign him after his 2003, 6-year, $26 million contract lapsed in the 2009 offseason.

San Francisco 49ers
An unrestricted free agent after the 2008 season, Smith agreed to terms with the San Francisco 49ers on March 27, 2009. The deal contained a maximum value of $10.5 million. Smith announced his retirement on August 28.

References

External links
Pittsburgh Steelers bio
San Francisco 49ers bio

1978 births
Living people
Players of American football from Oakland, California
African-American players of American football
American football offensive tackles
American Conference Pro Bowl players
Arizona State Sun Devils football players
Pittsburgh Steelers players
San Francisco 49ers players
21st-century African-American sportspeople
20th-century African-American sportspeople